John Joseph Byrne (23 September 1878 – 29 July 1942) was an Irish politician. He was first elected to Dáil Éireann as a Cumann na nGaedheal Teachta Dála (TD) for the Dublin North constituency at the June 1927 general election. He was re-elected at the September 1927 and 1932 general elections. He lost his seat at the 1933 general election. He was an unsuccessful candidate at the 1937 general election.

References

1878 births
1942 deaths
Cumann na nGaedheal TDs
Members of the 5th Dáil
Members of the 6th Dáil
Members of the 7th Dáil
Politicians from County Dublin